Al(l)an or Allen Thomas may refer to:

 Alan B. Thomas Jr., businessman and American government official
 Alan G. Thomas (1911–1992), British bibliophile and Lawrence Durrell scholar
 Alan G. Thomas (scientist) (1927–2019), British materials scientist
 Alan Thomas (philosopher) (born 1964), British philosopher
 Alan Thomas (cricketer) (born 1947), former English cricketer
 Allan Thomas (born 1990), Lebanese-South African football goalkeeper
 Allen Thomas (1830–1907), Confederate States Army brigadier general
 Allen M. Thomas (born 1969), former mayor of Greenville, North Carolina

See also
Alun Thomas (disambiguation)